Sir Laurence Nunns Guillemard  (7 June 1862 – 13 December 1951) was a British civil servant who served as high commissioner in Malaya when it was under the British Empire.

Early life
Guillemard was the only son of Rev. William Guillemard. He was educated at Charterhouse School and Trinity College, Cambridge.

Career
Guillemard entered the civil service in 1886 and joined the Treasury in 1888 where he was a Private Secretary to both Chancellors of the Exchequer, Sir William Harcourt and Sir Michael Hicks Beach between 1892 and 1902. In May 1902, he was appointed Deputy-Chairman of the Board of Inland Revenue and Chairman of the Board of Customs in 1908.

He was appointed Governor of the Straits Settlements and High Commissioner for the Federated Malay States in 1920 and retired from the civil service in 1927.

Awards and honours
Guillemard was invested as a Companion of Order of the Bath (CB) in 1905, Knight Commander of the Order of the Bath (KCB) in 1910, and a Knight Commander of the Order of St Michael and St George (KCMG) in 1923. He was later awarded Knight Grand Cross of the Order of St Michael and St George (GCMG) in the 1927 New Year Honours.

Personal life
He married in 1902, Ella Walker (1881-1940), daughter of Thomas Spencer Walker. She predeceased him.

Legacy
Guillemard Bridge was named after him.

References

External links
 Listing of Photographic Collection for 'Guillemard, Sir Laurence Nunns (1862-1951) Knight, colonial governor' held at Cambridge University (Janus)
GUILLEMARD, Sir Laurence Nunns, Who Was Who, A & C Black, 1920–2016 (online edition, Oxford University Press, 2014)

1862 births
1951 deaths
People educated at Charterhouse School
Alumni of Trinity College, Cambridge
British civil servants
Governors of the Straits Settlements
High Commissioners of the United Kingdom to Malaysia
Knights Grand Cross of the Order of St Michael and St George
Knights Commander of the Order of the Bath
Grand Cordons of the Order of the Rising Sun
Administrators in British Singapore
Administrators in British Malaya